is a Shinto shrine located in Suginami, Tokyo, Japan. It is a Hachiman shrine, dedicated to the kami Hachiman. It was established in 1063. Its main festival is held annually on September 15. Kami enshrined here include Emperor Ōjin, Empress Jingū and Emperor Chūai in addition to Hachiman.

See also
Hachiman shrine
Ōmiya Hachiman Shrine (Hyōgo)
Beppyo shrines

External links
Official website

Shinto shrines in Tokyo
1060s establishments in Japan
1063 establishments in Asia
Hachiman shrines
Religious buildings and structures completed in 1063
11th-century Shinto shrines
Suginami